Ebbe Carsten Hornemann Hertzberg (11 April 1847 – 2 October 1912) was a Norwegian professor and social economist. He was also a legal historian  and published several works in that field.

Biography
Hertzberg was born at Holmestrand in  Vestfold, Norway.  He was the son of Johan Christian Linde Hertzberg (1816–84) and Inger Horneman (1820–95). He attended the University of Christiania (now University of Oslo). In 1868, he was awarded the Crown Prince's gold medal (Kronprinsens gullmedalje) for  a thesis regarding  changes in Norwegian  judicial institutions. He graduated as cand.jur. in 1870.
He earned a travel scholarship and studied at Uppsala University from 1870. From 1872 to 1873, he studied under   legal historian Konrad Maurer at the University of Munich.

He was appointed professor of statistics and economics  at the University of Christiania  in 1877. He was a short-time government minister during April-June 1884 as  a member of the Council of State Division in Stockholm.

 

In 1886, Hertzberg withdrew from public life and moved away from Kristiania for a decade. Officially, this was motivated by a desire to focus on his research, but in reality he been pushed to resign by the university after admitting to being homosexual. During his exile in Berlin, Holmestrand, Munich and Stockholm, he completed his greatest work, a glossary of historic Norwegian legal terms, Glossarium til Norges gamle love.

In 1896, he returned to Kristiania where in 1903 he became director of Norges Hypotekbank and in 1906 he was appointed as an administrator in the National Archives. In 1901, he was awarded  Knight 1st Class  and in 1907 was decorated  Commander of the Royal Norwegian Order of St. Olav.

Selected works
Grundtrækkene i den ældste norske proces (1874)
Om kreditens begreb og væsen (1877)
Glossarium til Norges gamle love (1895)

References

Bibliography
 Glossarium zu Norges gamle Love indtil 1387. Volltextversion auf CD-ROM eingeleitet u. mit e. Bibliographie versehen von Hans Fix. Saarbrücken: AQ-Verlag 2013.

External link

1847 births
1912 deaths
People from Holmestrand
University of Oslo alumni
Uppsala University alumni
19th-century Norwegian historians
Norwegian economists
Norwegian educators
Directors-General of the National Archives of Norway
19th-century Norwegian politicians
Academic staff of the University of Oslo
Norwegian expatriates in Sweden
Norwegian expatriates in Germany
Norwegian LGBT politicians
Norwegian gay writers